The 2016–17 División de Honor was the 80th season of the División de Honor, Spain's premier field hockey league for women. It began on 24 September 2016 and concluded on 20 May 2017.

Sanse Complutense were the defending champions.

Teams
A total of 10 teams participated in the 2016–2017 edition of the División de Honor. The promoted team was Atlètic Terrassa and CH Pozuelo, who replaced UD Taburiente and Tenis.

Results

Regular season

Table

Play–down
As the second placed team in the 2016–17 Primera División, Tenis played in a two-match relegation/promotion series against Atlètic Terrassa. 

|}

Play–offs

Quarter-finals

|}

Club de Campo won the series 2–0.

Júnior won the series 3–2 in penalties, after the series finished 1–1.

Sanse Complutense won the series 2–0.

Real Sociedad won the series 2–0.

Semi-finals

Final

Top goalscorers

References

External links
Official website

División de Honor Femenina de Hockey Hierba
Spain
field hockey
field hockey